The Price of Fame is a 1916 American silent drama film directed by Charles Brabin and starring Marc McDermott, Naomi Childers and L. Rogers Lytton.

Cast
 Marc McDermott as John Thatcher / William Thatcher
 Naomi Childers as Constance Preston
 L. Rogers Lytton as Metz
 Logan Paul as Mr. Thatcher
 Mary Maurice as Mrs. Thatcher
 Philip Quinn as Butler

References

Bibliography
 Langman, Larry. Destination Hollywood: The Influence of Europeans on American Filmmaking. McFarland, 2000.

External links
 

1916 films
1916 drama films
1910s English-language films
American silent feature films
Silent American drama films
American black-and-white films
Films directed by Charles Brabin
Vitagraph Studios films
1910s American films